Krasny Vostok is a rural locality (a village) in Bakhmutsky Selsoviet, Kuyurgazinsky District, Bashkortostan, Russia. The population was 66 as of 2010. There is 1 street.

Geography 
Krasny Vostok is located 12 km east of Yermolayevo (the district's administrative centre) by road. Pokrovka is the nearest rural locality.

References 

Rural localities in Kuyurgazinsky District